Baquia may refer to:

 Bequia, Caribbean island
 Baguia, East Timor